Katangiella squamivela is a species of beetles in the family Buprestidae, the only species in the genus Katangiella. It is an African species described in 1988.

References

Monotypic Buprestidae genera